is a railway station located in Nakagawa-ku, Nagoya, Aichi, Japan.

Lines
Nagoya Railroad
Meitetsu Nagoya Main Line

Layout
One island platform serves two tracks.

Platform

History
Sannō Station opened in September 1944. Following the Dragons' move to Nagoya Dome in 1997, the station name was restored in January 2005.

Adjacent stations

References

External links
  

Stations of Nagoya Railroad
Railway stations in Aichi Prefecture
Railway stations in Japan opened in 1944